South of I-10 is the fourth studio album from Sonny Landreth. The album features his first collaboration with Mark Knopfler.

The album featured the first music video for Sonny Landreth for his song, "Native Stepson".

Track listing
"Shooting for the Moon" (Landreth) - 3:33
"Creole Angel" (Landreth) - 4:16
"Native Stepson" (Landreth) - 3:36
"Orphans of the Motherland" (Landreth) - 3:37
"Congo Square" (Landreth, Melton, Ranson)- 6:24
"Turning Wheel" (Landreth) - 4:35
"South of I-10" (Landreth) - 3:39
"Cajun Waltz" (Landreth) - 3:41
"Mojo Boogie" (Lenoir) - 4:31
"C'Est Chaud"(Landreth) - 3:19
"Great Gulf Wind" (Toussaint) - 5:07
"Untitled Track" (Landreth) - 1:40

Personnel
Sonny Landreth - lead vocals, lead guitar
Allen Toussaint - Piano
Marce Lacouture - Background vocals
Steve Conn - Hammond B-3 Organ
David Ranson - Bass
Greg Morrow - Drums and percussion
R.S. Field - Acoustic rhythm guitar
With:
Mark Knopfler - Background vocals ("Shootin' for the Moon"), National rhythm guitars ("Creole Angel"), Lead and rhythm guitars ("Congo Square")

References

External links
Official Sonny Landreth website

1995 albums
Sonny Landreth albums